RHG may refer to:
 Rehden–Hamburg gas pipeline
 Rainforest hunter-gatherers, or African Pygmies